Blaby & Whetstone Athletic Football Club is a football club based in Whetstone, near Leicester, Leicestershire, England.

History
The club was founded in 1928 as Whetstone Athletic and initially played in the Leicester City League. They joined Division Two of the Leicestershire Senior League in 1967, and after finishing third in 1970–71, were promoted to Division One. However, they finished bottom of Division One the following season, and were relegated back to Division Two. In 1974–75 Whetstone were Division Two runners-up and were promoted to Division One. However, they were relegated again the following season after finishing second-from-bottom of Division One. In 1983 Division Two was renamed Division One, and in 1993 the club adopted their current name after moving to the Warwick Road and absorbing the Blaby Boys Club.

The 1999–2000 season saw Blaby & Whetstone finish as Division One runners-up, earning promotion to the Premier Division. They won the Battle of Britain Cup in 2004–05, beating Thurnby Rangers in the final, and went on to win both the League Cup and the Leicestershire and Rutland Senior Cup in 2007–08, claiming the latter with a 2–0 win against Anstey Town after extra time. The following season they were runners-up in the Premier Division. After finishing third in 2010–11, they were promoted to the East Midlands Counties League. In 2013–14 they won the Westerby Cup, beating Quorn 2–0 in the final.

In March 2018, Blaby & Whetstone resigned from the East Midlands Counties League. They were subsequently accepted into the Premier Division of the Leicestershire Senior League for the 2018–19 season.

Honours
Leicestershire Senior League
League Cup winners 2007–08
Westerby Cup
Winners 2013–14
Leicestershire and Rutland Senior Cup
Winners 2007–08
Battle of Britain Cup
Winners 2004–05

Records
Best FA Cup performance: Second qualifying round, 2013–14, 2014–15
Best FA Vase performance: Third round, 2003–04

See also
Blaby & Whetstone Athletic F.C. players

References

External links

Football clubs in England
Football clubs in Leicestershire
1928 establishments in England
Association football clubs established in 1928
Leicester City Football League
Leicestershire Senior League
East Midlands Counties Football League